One Way... or Another is the second album by American hard rock band Cactus, released in 1971 under the Atco label. It includes several original songs as well as two cover versions: Little Richard's 1956 big hit "Long Tall Sally" (also recorded by Elvis Presley) and Chuck Willis' "I Feel So Bad" as "Feel So Bad".. [Their first album contained the opposite song "Feel So Good"].

Background
Following the same six originals, two covers formula of their debut album Cactus, Cactus released their second album One Way... or Another in February 1971. The album was released just seven months after their first, and was recorded at the new Electric Lady Studio with the renowned Eddie Kramer and his team at the engineers console. "Long Tall Sally", in a slower tempo than the original, opens the album with a rousing start. The album then runs through a string of original compositions interspersed with Chuck Willis' 1954 song "Feel So Bad". Also included is a short instrumental, "Song for Aries", that showcases McCarty's underrated lead guitar.

Track listing
All titles by Appice, Bogert, Day, McCarty except as pointed below
"Long Tall Sally" (Robert "Bumps" Blackwell, Enotris Johnson, Richard Penniman) – 5:54
"Rockout Whatever You Feel Like" – 4:00
"Rock N' Roll Children" – 5:44
"Big Mama Boogie - Parts I & II" – 5:29
"Feel So Bad" (Chuck Willis) – 5:31
"Song for Aries" (Appice, Day, McCarty) – 3:05
"Hometown Bust" – 6:39
"One Way... or Another" – 5:06

Personnel

Cactus
 Tim Bogert – bass, backing and lead (2) vocals
 Carmine Appice – drums, backing vocals, percussion
 Jim McCarty – guitar
 Rusty Day – lead vocals (all but 2), harmonica

Technical
 Cactus – producer, design
 Edwin H. Kramer – engineer
 Dave Palmer, John Jansen - assistant engineers
 Alan Azzolino – cover photo
 Jim Cummins  – sleeve & poster photography

Charts

References

External links
One Way...Or Another on Amazon.com
One Way...Or Another on the iTunes Store

Cactus (American band) albums
1971 albums
Albums recorded at Electric Lady Studios
Atco Records albums